An engineer is a professional practitioner in various disciplines of engineering.

Engineer may also refer to:

Occupations
Audio engineer or sound mixer, an operator of recording, broadcasting and mixing consoles
Flight engineer, an operator of aircraft systems
Engine officer, also called an engineer, an operator of propulsion systems in the engine department of a ship
Railroad engineer, an operator of a locomotive
Stationary engineer, an operator of boilers, turbines and generators
Engineer officer, a type of military officer in charge of military engineering
A soldier who performs building, digging, repairing and similar work:
Combat engineer
Pioneer (military)
Sapper

Arts, entertainment, and media

Fictional characters
Engineer (comics), the title of two Wildstorm comics characters
Engineer (Team Fortress 2), a playable class in the video game
Engineers, a race of aliens, forerunners of humanity, from the 2012 film Prometheus
The Engineer (comics), a comics character and a member of The Authority (superhero team)

Music

Groups
Engineer (band), an American metal band
Engineers (band), a British rock band

Albums
Engineers (Engineers album), 2005
Engineers (Gary Numan album), 1980

Other arts, entertainment, and media
Engineer (film), a Tamil language film originally slated to be released in 1999
The Engineer (UK magazine), a United Kingdom magazine first published 1856
Engineer (US magazine), a magazine published by the U.S. Army Engineer School
The Western Electric Engineer, also published as The Engineer, by  Western Electric

School-related
Engineer's degree, a graduate degree ranking higher than Master of Philosophy but lower than Doctor of Philosophy
Engineer, a student or alumnus of Brooklyn Technical High School
Engineer, an alumnus of one of the French Grandes Écoles
MIT Engineers, the name of Massachusetts Institute of Technology sports teams
RPI Engineers, the name of Rensselaer Polytechnic Institute sports teams

Other uses
Engineer (name)
Engineer (horse), an English Thoroughbred stallion
The Engineer (inn), an inn in Cambridge subsequently renamed The Crown and then The Flying Pig